Tethysaurus is an extinct genus of tethysaurine mosasauroid from the Early Turonian (Late Cretaceous) period. The only species is Tethysaurus nopcsai.

Discovery
 
The name means "Tethys' lizard of Nopcsa", a reference to the Greek goddess of the sea Tethys (also the name of the Tethys Ocean, an ancient sea between southern Europe and northern Africa) and to the Hungarian paleontologist Baron Ferenc Nopcsa, who made pioneering studies on Adriatic aquatic squamates. It was found in the Akrabou Formation, near the villages of Tadirhourst and Asfla in the region of Goulmima, Errachidia Province, in Morocco, with three referred specimens that included a nearly complete articulated skull, mandible, vertebrae and portions of the appendicular skeleton. The diagnosis after Bardet et al. is "(...) prefrontal strongly vaulted in anterior view; parietal exhibits a triangular table ending posteriorly in two pointed pegs overlying the supraoccipital; jugal with a large and wide ascending ramus; medullar floor of the basioccipital pierced by three foramina; splenial with a large notched dorsomedial process; surangular exposed medially ventral to the coronoid; dental formula: 19-20 maxillary, 15-19 pterygoid and at least 19 dentary teeth; large paracotylar and parazygosphenal foramina on vertebrae."

Description
More recent analysis put Tethysaurus in a clade along Russellosaurus and Yaguarasaurus called the parafamily Russellosaurina, as a basal Turonian clade of Mosasauridae.

Phylogeny

Cladogram based in the analysis by Makádi et al. in 2012:

See also

 List of mosasaurs

References

External links
 Oceans of Kansas
 Paleobiology Database: Tethysaurus

Russellosaurins
Mosasaurs of Africa
Fossil taxa described in 2003